Peter Gardiner may refer to:

 Peter Gardiner (actor) (born 1968), Swedish actor and dancer
 Peter Gardiner (sportsman) (1896–1975), Scottish cricketer and footballer